Foreign trade of Argentina includes economic activities both within and outside Argentina especially with regards to merchandise exports and imports, as well as trade in services.

Colonial and early history 
Argentina's primary exports in colonial times were largely limited to salted beef due to the fact that beef would not stay fresh during trans-Atlantic shipping - a problem which similarly precluded most grain exports until the 1870s.

Modern history
Argentina developed an agro-export model where they were highly dependent on the external sector, exporting commodities mostly to Western Europe. Much as colonial elites tried to emulate European styles, a wave of European investment and immigration so reshaped local culture and architecture in the late 19th and early 20th centuries (primarily in the Pampas area), that visitors often compared Buenos Aires with Paris.

Agriculturally and thinly populated, Argentina recorded trade surpluses for most of the period between 1900 and 1948, including a cumulative US$1 billion during World War I and US$1.7 billion during World War II. But record taxes on grain exports imposed by the administration of President Juan Perón (1946-55) and an increasing need for costly fuel and machinery helped result in a nearly-unbroken string of trade deficits between 1949 and 1962.

Perón and, most notably, President Arturo Frondizi (1958-62), encouraged foreign as well as local investment in energy and industry as part of a developmentalist policy of import substitution industrialization. Trade deficits in the 1950s initially limited development due to the need for expensive machinery and supplies and a shortage of foreign exchange. But drawn to an economy that provided Latin America's highest standard of living, domestic and foreign investors responded, industrial production more than doubled, and the country's trade position became modestly positive throughout the 1963–79 era, even as domestic demand grew.

Policies of "free trade" financial deregulation pursued by Argentina's last dictatorship led to a sudden, record deficit in 1980 and, by 1981, a mountain of bad debts and financial collapse. The climate of slack domestic demand that prevailed in Argentina throughout the 1980s resulted in a cumulative US$38 billion in surpluses from 1982 to 1991; this brought the economy little direct benefit, however, as much of this was deposited abroad during that era of interest payment burdens and financial instability.

Economy Minister Domingo Cavallo enacted the Convertibility Law of 1991, pegging the monetary value of the Argentine peso to the United States dollar. The fixed exchange rate (1 peso to the dollar) allowed for a macroeconomic stabilization. Taking advantage of this low exchange rate, on the lower tariffs on imports and on the reappearance of credit after the free trade liberalization measures taken by President Carlos Menem's administration, Argentine firms and consumers tripled capital goods purchases from 1990 to 1994, while depressed auto sales rose by fivefold. The influx of imported machines and supplies helped the modernization of the country's industrial base; but it negatively impacted its trade balance, which accumulated US$22 billion in deficits from 1992 to 1999; the current account deficit, which would include growing foreign debt interest payments and deficits in trade in services, reached a record deficit of US$14 billion in 1998 alone.

Relying on sizable foreign investment inflows to balance the current account, these did not suffice and the Central Bank was again forced to resort to borrowing to protect the peso's value against such pressure (mostly by floating bonds, then the most sought-after in the developing world). Recession helped lead to a US$1 billion surplus in 2000 and another US$6 billion in 2001; but it was too little, too late. Buffeted by generalized global instability, the international derivatives market massively shorted Argentine bonds in the second half of 2001 and on December 23, following a spate of unpopular crisis measures, the Argentine government declared a default on US$93 billion of its bonds, the largest sovereign debt default in history.

Crisis and recovery
Immediately after the collapse of the Argentine economy at the end of 2001 and the devaluation of the peso in 2002, imports fell over half and Argentina's trade surplus soared to over US$16 billion, providing for the first current account surplus since 1990. As recovery ensued and the exchange rate stabilized around 3 pesos/dollar, exports (mainly soy, cereals and other agricultural products, as well as machinery and fuels) grew steadily.

Imports began recovering sharply in 2003, as both the purchasing power of the peso and domestic demand increased, and, despite this, from 2003 to 2011 the nation's merchandise trade balance recorded a cumulative US$115 billion in surpluses. These surpluses were bolstered as much by growing exports as by a marked recovery in terms of trade for Argentina, which by 2010 had improved 40% over the level prevailing in the 1990s. The nation's perennial trade deficit in manufactures widened during this expansion, however, and exceeded US$30 billion in 2011. Accordingly, the system of non-automatic import licensing was extended in 2011, and regulations were enacted for the auto sector establishing a model by which a company's future imports would be determined by their exports (though not necessarily in the same rubric). Domestic production grew to supply the majority of the Argentine market in a number of important rubrics historically dominated by imports amid these changes, including diverse manufactures such as information technology, major appliances, footwear, and farm machinery.

A collapse in global commodity prices in 2014 led to trade deficits for most of the 2015-18 period, culminating in a record current account deficit in 2017 of US$31 billion and an ensuing foreign debt crisis. The 2018 crisis, however, pushed imports down by 37% from 2017 to 2020, yielding US$50 billion in cumulative trade surpluses from 2019 to 2022 despite a 92% recovery in imports from 2020 to 2022 - though practically nil in total current account surpluses, due to higher foreign debt interest outlays.

Trade in services has historically been in deficit for Argentina, as both travel and foreign debt interest outlays often far outstrip services income. Annual services deficits averaged around US$5 billion in the 1980s and 1990s (mainly due to foreign debt payments) - but after the 2001 crisis, fell to around US$1 billion annually until 2007. Services deficits rose steadily afterward to a record US$9.7 billion in 2017, then easing to US$3.6 billion by 2021 - but jumping to around US$8 billion in 2022, largely as a result of renewed outbound travel by Argentines.

Commercial relationships

Mercosur
Mercosur—the customs union that includes Argentina, Brazil, Paraguay, and Uruguay—entered into force January 1, 1995; Bolivia, Chile, and Venezuela joined the pact subsequently as associate members. Cooperation between Brazil and Argentina (historic competitors) is the key to Mercosur's integration process, which includes political and military elements in addition to a customs union; Brazil accounts for 74% of Mercosur GDP and Argentina about 23%. Argentine intra-Mercosur trade rose dramatically from US$4 billion in 1991 to US$23 billion in 1998; it declined to US$9 billion during the 2002 crisis, but recovered quickly and reached US$44 billion in 2011 (28% of the Argentine total). More than 90% of intra-Mercosur trade is duty-free, while the group's common external tariff (CET) applies to more than 85% of imported goods. Remaining goods will be phased into the CET by 2006.

Brazil's higher level of industrialization and production capacity, as well as other economic asymmetries, have been a source of tension with Argentina. Following the 2001-02 crisis, Argentina's recovering industrial sector has pressured the government to obtain restrictions (especially quotas) on Mercosur's free trade regulations, in order to protect their growth from what they see as disloyal competition from their larger partner to the north. Exports to Brazil helped lessen the impact of the crisis on the industrial sector somewhat, though Argentina's intra-Mercosur trade yielded it a cumulative US$15 billion deficit from 2004 to 2008. A renewed devaluation of the peso contributed to a US$700 million surplus with Mercosur in 2009, though deficits of US$1.8 billion were recorded in 2010 and 2011.

Argentine trade with fellow Mercosur nations reached US$35 billion in 2022, and as in most years remained in deficit for Argentina with US$15.8 billion in exports and US$19.3 billion in imports. Mercosur buys 68% of Argentine exports of motor vehicles and auto parts, and these made up three-eights to total exports to the bloc in 2022.

China
Trade with China was negligible until 1992; it later grew rapidly and by 2010, China became Argentina's second largest trading partner. Argentine exports to the Asian giant are mainly soy, beef, barley and, increasingly, lithium carbonate - while imports are mainly industrial and consumer goods. Modest Argentine surpluses with China turned into deficits in 2008, however, and anti-dumping measures enacted subsequently triggered a Chinese boycott of its top Argentine import, soy oil, in 2010. Following trade negotiations, soy oil purchases from China resumed in 2011.

Argentina's merchandise trade deficit with China has mostly grown since then, reaching US$9.5 billion on US$17.5 billion in imports by 2022; China is now Argentina's leading source of imports by nation, with 21.5%.

These deficits have, in recent years, been partly financed by China itself by way of foreign exchange swaps. The two central banks first established these swap facilities in 2017, and expanded them to 130 billion yuan ($19.2 billion) in December 2018. In November 2022, Argentina and China agreed to add another 35 billion yuan (US$5.2 billion).

China has become the largest investor in Argentina's growing lithium mining sector, which by 2030 is projected by JPMorgan Chase to become the second-largest in the world - only behind Australia.

United States
The United States replaced the United Kingdom in the 1920s as both the leading source of manufactures and of imports overall. The U.S. share of imports and exports remained relatively stable at around 20% and 10%, respectively, until 2002; these proportions declined steadily afterward and by 2010, were approximately half the historical percentages. The U.S. has largely maintained a moderate trade surplus with Argentina, however. The record for this figure was logged in 1998, when the U.S. reaped a nearly US$3.7 billion surplus; this deficit later declined significantly, to then recover to US$3.5 billion by 2011. 

Petrochemicals, gold, silver, and aluminum are the leading Argentine exports to the U.S., and wine the leading Argentine consumer good in the U.S. market; Argentine imports are in turn mainly industrial. Fresh Argentine beef was exported to the U.S. market in 1997 for the first time in over 60 years, and in 1999 its export quota of 20,000 tons was filled. Beef exports to the U.S. were suspended in August 2000 when Argentine cattle near the border with Paraguay (whose authorities refuse to vaccinate cattle against highly contagious hoof and mouth disease) were discovered to have anti-bodies for the infection. The quota was reinstated in early 2002 and has since averaged 28,000 tons.

The Obama administration suspended Argentine participation in the Generalized System of Preferences (GSP) in 2012, citing a failure to pay arbitration payments awarded by the World Bank's ICSID to a number of U.S. firms adversely impacted by the 2002 devaluation of the peso. The GSP benefit (US$18 million in 2011) is relatively minimal, equaling 0.4% of Argentine exports to the U.S. of US$4.2 billion.

U.S.-Argentine trade has nevertheless grown - albeit slowly - and Argentina remains one of a few countries with which the U.S. routinely maintains a merchandise trade surplus. Mutual trade reached nearly US$20 billion in 2022, with US$6.9 billion in U.S. imports from Argentina and US$12.8 billion in exports to Argentina.

Trade in services with Argentina has been especially advantageous for the U.S., with Argentina's services deficit with the U.S. reaching US$5 billion in 2019 - the entirety for that year.

European Union

Argentina has a thriving and longstanding trade relationship with the European Union, as well as close historic and cultural ties dating to the colonial era that spanned 300 years until independence in 1816.

European investment and immigration dramatically reshaped Argentina after 1880 - and the British Empire in particular dominated Argentine trade with over a third of the total until World War I, buying mainly meats and cereals in exchange for a wide variety of consumer and industrial goods.

Argentine trade with Europe gradually declined in relation to other partner nations and regions. But the EU is still Argentina's third largest trading partner (after Brazil and China) and accounted for 13% of total Argentine trade in 2022, or US$22 billion - nearly balanced between imports from the EU (US$10.8 billion) and exports (US$11.1 billion). Argentina's main exports to the EU are processed agricultural products (38%), chemical products (21%) and fish and seafood (8%). The EU exports to Argentina mainly manufactured products, such as machinery and appliances (28%) and chemical products, including pharmaceutical products (29%).

Trade in services, which was relatively stable until 2019, was temporarily affected during the COVID pandemic - to later rebound. In 2020, the EU imported services from Argentina worth 1.6 billion euros, while it exported services worth 3.5 billion euros.

Argentina is also an important investment destination for European companies, particularly Spain. The stock of investments from the EU was 35.8 billion euros in 2020, making the EU, as a bloc, the top foreign investor in the country. Some 21 EU member states have signed agreements for the promotion and reciprocal protection of investments with Argentina, and as of 2022, the European Investment Bank had a portfolio of loans amounting to € 655 million in Argentina (including loans under preparation).

Intellectual property issues
Argentina adheres to most treaties and international agreements on intellectual property. It is a member of the World Intellectual Property Organization and signed the Uruguay Round agreements in December 1993, including measures related to intellectual property. However, extension of adequate patent protection to pharmaceuticals has been a highly contentious bilateral issue.

In May 1997, the U.S. suspended 50% of Argentina's GSP benefits because of its allegedly unsatisfactory pharmaceutical patent law. In May 1999, The U.S. Government initiated consultations under World Trade Organization procedures to address these inadequacies and expanded the consultations in May 2007.

Merchandise exports and imports

Foreign trade by type of product
Argentine foreign trade in 2022 by type of product (million US$):

Foreign trade by leading export destinations
Argentine foreign trade in 2022 by leading export destinations, and chief exports and imports with each (million US$):

Exports by province
Argentine exports in 2022 by province and type (million US$):

References

 
Economy of Argentina